Castagnaccio (locally also known as baldino, ghirighio or pattona) is a plain chestnut flour cake, typically found in the Tuscany, Liguria, Piedmont, Emilia-Romagna, Veneto regions of Italy, and in the French island of Corsica.

It is a typically autumnal dessert, made by a dough of chestnut, water, olive oil, pine nuts, and raisins, and baked. Local variations may include other ingredients, such as rosemary, orange rind, fennel seeds, and other dried fruit.  There are also variations on the thickness of the cake, and specific names are sometimes used locally to refer to such variations.  For example, in Livorno, a castagnaccio 3 centimeters thick is called "toppone".

Castagnaccio is best served with ricotta, chestnut honey or sweet wines such as vin santo.

Castagnaccio is a typical rural dessert of the Appennini area, where chestnuts used to be a staple food of country communities.  During the economic growth following World War II it lost its role as the main sweet in these areas, and is now prepared and sold mostly as an autumn delicacy.

The  by Ortensio Landi (1553) credits some "Pilade from Lucca" as the inventor of the castagnaccio ("").

References

External links
 Italian Castagnaccio (chestnut flour cake) recipe

Corsican desserts
Italian cakes